The Woodlands Golf Course, designed by Lindsay Ervin and sister course of Greystone golf course, opened in 1998.

External links
 http://www.baltimoregolfing.com
 Woodlands Golf Course Article
 Reviews and Ratings of Woodlands Golf Course

 

Buildings and structures in Baltimore County, Maryland
Golf clubs and courses in Maryland